TBC Corporation (TBC) is an American corporation and marketer of automotive replacement tires.

History
In 1956, a purchasing group of tire retailers formed Cordovan Associates. The Company changed its name to Tire & Battery Corporation in 1972. Eleven years later, Tire & Battery Corporation went public (NASDAQ: TBCC). In 2005, the company was purchased by Sumitomo Corporation of America (SCOA), one of Japan's major integrated trading and investment business enterprises. In 2018, Michelin North America and Sumitomo Corporation of Americas combined their respective North American tire distribution and related service operations in a 50–50 joint venture agreement, creating National Tire Wholesale (NTW).

Company operations
TBC markets on a wholesale basis to regional tire chains and distributors serving independent tire dealers throughout the United States, Canada, and Mexico. Through distribution centers, the company also markets directly to independent tire dealers across the United States. NTW sells a wide variety of proprietary and national brands from over 100 distribution centers. 

TBC owns a number of industry brands, including:

National Tire Wholesale (NTW)
Midas, a franchised automotive service chain. Purchased by TBC Corporation in 2012.
Big O Tires, a franchise selling automobile tires. Purchased by TBC Corporation in 1996.
Tire Kingdom, purchased by TBC Corporation in 2000.
National Tire and Battery, acquired by TBC Corporation in 2003 from Sears.

References

External links

 
2005 mergers and acquisitions
Automotive repair shops of the United States
Palm Beach Gardens, Florida
Joint ventures
Companies based in Palm Beach County, Florida
1980s initial public offerings